Exogyra is an extinct genus of fossil marine oysters in the family Gryphaeidae, the foam oysters or honeycomb oysters. These bivalves grew cemented by the more cupped left valve. The right valve is flatter, and the beak is curved to one side. Exogyra lived on solid substrates in warm seas during the Jurassic and Cretaceous periods.

Taxonomy 
The former subgenus Exogyra (Aetostreon) Bayle, 1878  is sometimes considered a separate genus, due to a lack of the fine set of parallel ribs (chomata) separated by pits, on the inner surface of the valves (which is present in the nominate subgenus).

Species

Distribution 
Fossils of Exogyra have been found in:
Jurassic
Afghanistan, Chile, China, Eritrea, Ethiopia, France, Germany, India, Kenya, Poland, Portugal, Somalia, Spain, Tanzania, the United Kingdom, and Yemen.

Cretaceous
Afghanistan, Algeria, Argentina, Brazil, Bolivia, Canada (British Columbia), Bulgaria, Chile, Colombia (Hiló Formation, Tolima, Macanal and Chipaque Formations, Eastern Ranges), Cuba, the Czech Republic, Egypt, Ethiopia, France, Germany, Greenland, Hungary, India, Iran, Italy, Jordan, Lebanon, Libya, Madagascar, Mexico, Morocco, Mozambique, New Zealand, Nigeria, Oman, Pakistan, Peru, Poland, Portugal, Serbia and Montenegro, Slovakia, South Africa, Spain, Sweden, Switzerland, Tanzania, Trinidad and Tobago, Tunisia, Turkey, USSR, Ukraine, the United Kingdom, United States (Alabama, Arizona, Arkansas, California, Colorado, Delaware, Georgia, Maryland, Minnesota, Mississippi, Missouri, Montana, New Jersey, New Mexico, North Carolina, Oklahoma, South Carolina, Tennessee, Texas, Utah, Wyoming), Venezuela, and Yemen.

References

Bibliography

Further reading 
 National Audubon Society Field Guide to North American Fossils

Gryphaeidae
Prehistoric bivalve genera
Jurassic bivalves
Cretaceous bivalves
Mesozoic animals of Africa
Cretaceous Africa
Mesozoic animals of Asia
Cretaceous Asia
Mesozoic animals of Europe
Cretaceous Europe
Mesozoic animals of North America
Cretaceous Canada
Cretaceous Mexico
Cretaceous United States
Mesozoic animals of South America
Cretaceous Argentina
Cretaceous Brazil
Mesozoic Chile
Cretaceous Colombia
Cretaceous Peru
Cretaceous Venezuela
Jurassic genus first appearances
Cretaceous extinctions
Fossils of Serbia
Fossil taxa described in 1820
Taxa named by Thomas Say